Matrix metalloproteinase-20 (MMP-20) also known as enamel metalloproteinase or enamelysin is an enzyme that in humans is encoded by the MMP20 gene.

Function 

Proteins of the matrix metalloproteinase (MMP) family are involved in the breakdown of extracellular matrix in normal physiological processes, such as embryonic development, reproduction, and tissue remodeling, as well as in disease processes, such as arthritis and metastasis. Most MMP's are secreted as inactive proproteins which are activated when cleaved by extracellular proteinases.

MMP-20, also known as enamelysin, appears to be the only MMP that is tooth-specific and it is expressed by cells of different developmental origin (i.e. epithelial ameloblasts and mesenchymal odontoblasts).

Clinical significance 

The human MMP-20 gene contains 10 exons and is part of a cluster of matrix metalloproteinase genes that localize to human chromosome 11q22.3. A mutation in this gene, which alters the normal splice pattern and results in premature termination of the encoded protein, has been associated with amelogenesis imperfecta. Enamel in the absence of MMP-20 is hypoplastic (thin), contains less mineral (only one-third as much total mineral as wild type), and contains more protein and water. In general, MMP-20 functions in enamel are to cleave enamel matrix proteins at specific cleavage sites.

References

Further reading

External links
 The MEROPS online database for peptidases and their inhibitors: M10.019
 

Matrix metalloproteinases
EC 3.4.24